Pascal Canavan is a former Gaelic footballer who played for the Tyrone county team. He played in Tyrone's second All-Ireland Final appearance in 1995 and captained Errigal Ciaran in 2002. He retired from inter-county football in 2002, following Tyrone's success in the National Football League.

Pascal was a Religious Education teacher at St Ciaran's High School in Ballygawley. He has often been involved in GAA within the school as the under-18 manager, his greatest achievement with St Ciarans was winning the All-Ireland with his co-manager Brendan Traynor. Following their success as joint managers with St Ciaran's they now are joint managers of the Buncrana GAA club in Donegal.  They got them promoted to Senior and are doing very well.

His younger brother is Tyrone's most successful individual player, Peter Canavan.

He is now the manager of Armagh division 1A champions Armagh harps

Honours
Club
 6 Tyrone Senior Football Championship 1993 1994 1997 2000 2002 2006
 2 Ulster Senior Club Football Championship 1992 2002
County
 3 Ulster Senior Football Championship 1995 1996 2001
 1 National Football League Division 1 2002
Awards
 1 Irish News Ulster All-Star 1996

References

Year of birth missing (living people)
Living people
Errigal Ciarán Gaelic footballers
Tyrone inter-county Gaelic footballers